Bo Let Ya (also spelt Bo Letya; born Hla Pe; 30 August 1911 – 29 November 1978) was a Burmese military officer and a member of the legendary Thirty Comrades who fought for Burma's independence from Britain. He also served as the 2nd Commander-in-chief of the Armed Forces of the Union of Burma (now Myanmar) and Deputy Prime Minister of Burma.

Early life 
He attended Myoma High School in Rangoon.

Career 
During the Second World War he was Chief of Staff of the Burma Defence Army (1942-1943) and as Deputy Minister of War in the Japanese puppet-state, the State of Burma (1943-1945). After the war, he replaced Aung San as Deputy Prime Minister and Defence Minister when the latter was assassinated on 19 July 1947. He was later made to resign from the post by AFPFL Government. He was involved in the 1947 Let Ya-Freeman Agreement. He also founded the Patriotic Burmese Army in 1969, an exile rebel army based in Thailand. During the 1950s and 1960s, following his resignation from his political and military posts, he founded Martaban Fisheries and became a millionaire businessman.

Throughout his career, he served the following posts:
 Deputy Minister of War Affairs (1943–1945)
 Defence Councillor (July 1947 – 1948)
 Deputy Prime Minister (January 1948 – 1952)
 Minister of Defence

Following the 1962 coup d'état, Bo Let Ya was imprisoned by the Union Revolutionary Council from 1963 to 1965.

Death 
On 29 November 1978, he was killed by Karen troops during a battle following a split in the Karen National Union's leadership.

References

1911 births
1978 deaths
People from Mandalay Region
Burmese military personnel
20th-century Burmese businesspeople
Government ministers of Myanmar
Deputy Prime Ministers of Myanmar
Defence ministers of Myanmar
Burmese collaborators with Imperial Japan